The 2007 German Figure Skating Championships took place on January 4–7, 2007 at the Eislaufzentrum Oberstdorf in Oberstdorf. Skaters competed in the disciplines of men's singles, ladies' singles, pair skating, ice dancing, and synchronized skating on the senior, junior, and novice levels.

The first senior compulsory dance was the Golden Waltz and the second was the Rhumba. The first junior compulsory dance was the Silver Samba and the second was the Midnight Blues.

Medalists

Senior results

Men

Ladies

Pairs

Ice dancing

Synchronized

Junior results

Men

Ladies A

Ladies B

Ice dancing

Synchronized

External links

 2007 German Championships: Senior, Junior, and novice synchronized results
 2007 German Championships: Youth and novice results

German Figure Skating Championships, 2007
German Figure Skating Championships